This article concerns the period 379 BC – 370 BC.

References